The 1955–56 SMU Mustangs men's basketball team represented Southern Methodist University as a member of the Southwest Conference during the 1955–56 NCAA men's basketball season. The team was led by head coach Doc Hayes and played their home games at Perkins Gymnasium in Dallas, Texas for the final season (SMU Coliseum opened in December 1956). Playing out of the Midwest region, the Mustangs made a run to the Final Four of the NCAA tournament – the first, and only, in program history. In the National semifinals, SMU lost to the eventual National champions, San Francisco, 86–68, in what was the Dons 54th consecutive victory. The Mustangs closed out the season with a loss to Temple in the consolation game to finish with a record of 25–4 (12–0). Three of the team's four losses came to Final Four participants.

Roster

Schedule and results

|-
!colspan=9 style=| Regular season

|-
!colspan=9 style=| NCAA Tournament

Rankings

Awards and honors
 Jim Krebs – All-American

References

SMU Mustangs men's basketball seasons
SMU Mustangs
NCAA Division I men's basketball tournament Final Four seasons
SMU
SMU
SMU